The Rational Academy are a 4 (sometimes 5, sometimes 6) piece band based in Brisbane, Australia. After a slew of 7" vinyl EP's they released their debut album "A Heart Against Your Own" in 2008. Produced by Lawrence English, the album married the Academy's pop leanings and guitar-heavy wall of sound approach with deeper avante garde and experimental interests. In 2009 they released their sophomore effort "Swans" and were awarded "Best New Music / Experimental" at the QMusic QSong awards, where they were also nominated for "Song of the Year".

Career
The earliest incarnation of the group focused around the songwriting of Benjamin Thompson and Meredith McHugh, a partnership which anchored The Rational Academy in the diverse musical worlds of cut-up folk, drone and pop. Following McHughs departure in 2008, Benjamin once again extended the group's lineup to include (at its core) Amelia Golding and Matt Deasy whilst also featuring longtime collaborators Lawrence English and Matt Jonas as well as Recording Engineer Todd Dixon.

They have shared the stage with the likes of Deerhunter, Deerhoof, Mum, Xiu Xiu, The Blow, Scout Nibblet, Dear Nora, Grouper, Spoon & Australian groups Art of Fighting and Holly Throsby. In 2008 they were invited by the Queensland Gallery of Modern art to perform as part of the "Andy Warhol Up Late" exhibition program.

The Rational Academy also create music under the moniker "White Bears of Norway" - the name being taken from an early Rational Academy song.

In 2007 Australian music journal Faster Louder wrote of them, "The next big thing. The IT band. We've been told this too often before. One listen to THE RATIONAL ACADEMY and smugly you can know this time Richard Kingsmill hasn't beaten you to it!"

In 2008 they released their debut album internationally through Someone Good, following up in 2009 with the mini album "Swans", also released through Someone Good.

Amelia Golding and Mike Cheng are no longer in the band, as of midway 2011.

Reception
Australia's Rave Magazine called it "an essential Brisbane release". Boomkat in Europe named it album of the week: "A Heart Against Your Own" is one of those rare albums that takes the fundamentals of the guitar band format and somehow organically expands upon that framework, incorporating the modernity of the electronic avant-garde without you even noticing you're listening to something as awkward and experimental as it actually is. Massive Recommendation" American music journal Tokafi had this to say: "A Heart against your own is an album which contains everything needed to fall head over heels for it – yet its minutely worked-out details and sonic finesse turn it into a work demanding respect as well."

Discography
"Swans" LP - 2009 Someone Good
"A Heart Against Your Own" LP - 2008 Someone Good
"Two Books / Handwritten Novels" 7"EP - 2007 Strong Cultures
"(drums)" 7"EP - 2005 Medical Records

References

External links
Chicago Album Review
Australian Album Review
European Album Review
Official Website
The Rational Academy on Myspace

Australian indie rock groups